Giulio Cesare Riccardi (died 13 Feb 1602) was a Roman Catholic prelate who served as Archbishop of Bari-Canosa (1592–1602) and Apostolic Nuncio to Savoy (1595–1601).

Biography
On 30 Oct 1592, Giulio Cesare Riccardi was appointed during the papacy of Pope Clement VIII as Archbishop of Bari-Canosa. On 15 Nov 1592, he was consecrated bishop by Enrico Caetani, Cardinal-Priest of Santa Pudenziana, with Guillaume de St-Marcel d'Avançon, Archbishop of Embrun, and Leonard Abel, Titular Bishop of Sidon, serving as co-consecrators. On 1 Apr 1595, he was appointed during the papacy of Pope Clement VIII as Apostolic Nuncio to Savoy where he served until 2 Aug 1601. He served as Archbishop of Bari-Canosa until his death on 13 Feb 1602.

References

External links and additional sources
 (for Chronology of Bishops) 
 (for Chronology of Bishops) 
 (for Chronology of Bishops) 

17th-century Roman Catholic archbishops in the Kingdom of Naples
16th-century Roman Catholic archbishops in the Kingdom of Naples
Bishops appointed by Pope Clement VIII
1602 deaths
Apostolic Nuncios to Savoy